Asselborn is a small town in the commune of Wincrange, in northern Luxembourg.  , the town has a population of 387.

Asselborn was a commune in the canton of Clervaux until 1 January 1978, when it was merged with the communes of Boevange, Hachiville, and Oberwampach to form the new commune of Wincrange.  The law creating Wincrange was passed on 31 October 1977.

Former commune
The former commune consisted of the villages:

 Asselborn
 Boxhorn
 Maulusmühle
 Rumlange
 Sassel
 Stockem
 Uschler
 Lentzweiler - partly shared with the former commune of Boevange
 Asselborn-Moulin (lieu-dit)
 Emeschbach-Asselborn (lieu-dit)
 Emeschbach-Stockem (lieu-dit)
 Bockmühle (lieu-dit)
 Cinqfontaines (lieu-dit)
 Asselborn-Route (lieu-dit)
 Stockem-Route (lieu-dit)

Footnotes

Towns in Luxembourg
Wincrange
Former communes of Luxembourg